David Abulafia  (born 12 December 1949) is an English historian with a particular interest in Italy, Spain and the rest of the Mediterranean during the Middle Ages and Renaissance. He spent most of his career at the University of Cambridge, rising to become a professor at the age of 50.  He retired in 2017 as Professor Emeritus of Mediterranean History. He is a Fellow of Gonville and Caius College, Cambridge. He was Chairman of the History Faculty at Cambridge University, 2003-5, and was elected a member of the governing Council of Cambridge University in 2008.  He is visiting Beacon Professor at the new University of Gibraltar, where he also serves on the Academic Board.  He is a visiting professor at the College of Europe (Natolin branch, Poland).

He is a Fellow of the British Academy and a member of the Academia Europaea.  In 2013 he was awarded one of three inaugural British Academy Medals for his work on Mediterranean history. In 2020, he was awarded the Wolfson History Prize for The Boundless Sea: A Human History of the Oceans.

Early life and education
Abulafia was born in Twickenham, Middlesex, into a Sephardic Jewish family. He was educated at St. Paul's School and King's College, Cambridge.

Academic career
Abulafia has published several books on Mediterranean history, beginning with his book The Two Italies in 1977. In this work, he argued that as far back as the twelfth century northern Italy exploited the agricultural resources of the Italian south, and that this provided the essential basis for the further expansion of trade and industry in Tuscany, Genoa and Venice. He edited volume 5 of the New Cambridge Medieval History and the volume on Italy in the central Middle Ages in the Oxford Short History of Italy; he also edited an important collection of studies of the French invasion of Italy in 1494-5 as well as a book on The Mediterranean in History which has appeared in six languages. He has given lectures in many countries including Italy, Spain, Portugal, France, Germany, Finland, Norway, the United States, Dominican Republic,  Japan, China, Israel, the UAE, Jordan,  and Egypt.

One of his most influential books is Frederick II: A Medieval Emperor, first published in England in 1988 and reprinted many times in several Italian editions. Here he looks at an iconic figure from the Middle Ages from a new perspective, criticizing the views of the famous German historian Ernst Kantorowicz concerning Frederick II of Hohenstaufen, whom Abulafia sees as a conservative figure rather than as a genius born out of his time.

He has been appointed Order of the Star of Italian Solidarity by the President of Italy in recognition of his writing on Italian history, especially Sicilian history, and he has also written about Spain, particularly the Balearic islands. He has shown an interest in the economic history of the Mediterranean, and in the meeting of the three Abrahamic faiths in the Mediterranean. Not confining himself to the Mediterranean, he has also written a much-praised book on the first encounters between western Europeans and the native societies of the Atlantic (the Canary islands, the Caribbean and Brazil) around 1492; this book is The Discovery of Mankind: Atlantic Encounters in the Age of Columbus (2008).

In 2011, Penguin Books (and Oxford University Press in New York) published his The Great Sea: A Human History of the Mediterranean, a substantial volume that sets out a different approach to Mediterranean history to that propounded by the French historian Fernand Braudel, and ranges in time from 22,000 BC to AD 2010. The book, which received the Mountbatten Literary Award from the Maritime Foundation, became a bestseller in UK non-fiction and was widely acclaimed. It has been translated into Dutch, Greek, Turkish, Spanish, German, Arabic, Italian, Korean, Chinese, Romanian and Portuguese, with further translations under contract.

Abulafia wrote The Boundless Sea: A Human History of the Oceans, published by Penguin in the UK and by Oxford University Press in the US in October 2019. This book applies a similar method to his history of the Mediterranean, looking at the people who moved across the open sea, and emphasizing the role of maritime trade in the political, cultural and economic history of humanity. It won the 2020 Wolfson History Prize.

He was the chairman of Historians for Britain, an organisation that lobbies to leave the European Union. According to Abulafia, the process of European Integration is "a myth used to silence other visions of European community". He has written opinion pieces criticising the UK's membership in the European Union, accusing the idea of European unity of being based upon "historical determinism".
He recently wrote a article in the Daily Telegraph titled "It would be uncivilised to give Greece the Elgin Marbles", where he wrote that they belong "in London, in a great universal museum, not in the narrow confines of Athens's Acropolis".

Personal life
In 1979, Abulafia married Anna Brechta Sapir. The couple have two adult daughters.

Interviews 
 "Humanity and the Great Seas: Conversation with David Abulafia", Hansong Li. Chicago Journal of History Issue VII, Autumn 2016.
 "Migration, Media and Intercultural Dialogue 2: Migration and Culture in the Mediterranean" The United Nations University Institute on Globalization, Culture and Mobility

Main works 
 The Two Italies: Economic Relations between the Norman Kingdom of Sicily and the Northern Communes, Cambridge 1977
 Frederick II: A Medieval Emperor, London 1988
 A Mediterranean Emporium: The Catalan Kingdom of Majorca, Cambridge 1994
 The Western Mediterranean Kingdoms, 1200–1500: The Struggle for Dominion, London 1997
 The Discovery of Mankind: Atlantic Encounters in the Age of Columbus, New Haven, CT 2008
 The Great Sea: A Human History of the Mediterranean, Oxford 2011
 The Boundless Sea: A Human History of the Oceans, London 2019

Notes

References 
 Who's Who 2011
 Debrett's People of Today 2011

External links

Historians for Britain Website

1949 births
Living people
English historians
English Jewish writers
English people of Spanish-Jewish descent
20th-century Sephardi Jews
21st-century Sephardi Jews
Alumni of King's College, Cambridge
Fellows of Gonville and Caius College, Cambridge
Historians of the Crusades
Historians of Sicily
Jewish historians
Historians from Twickenham
British medievalists
Historians of the Mediterranean
Members of the University of Cambridge faculty of history
Fellows of the British Academy
Recipients of the British Academy Medal
Fellows of the Royal Historical Society